Middleton is a locational Anglo-Saxon surname originating from dozens of different settlements in England going by one of the pre-7th-century Old English variations of "middle" (such as midel) and "town" (such as tun). The earliest recorded examples of such hamlets date to 1086 and include Middeltone, Mideltuna, and Middeltune in such Derbyshire, Shropshire, Sussex, and Yorkshire. The surname "Mideltone" is recorded in Oxfordshire (1166), "Midilton" is noted in Arbroath, Scotland (1221) and "Middelton" is found in Yorkshire (1273).

List of people surnamed Middleton
Andrew C. Middleton (1824–1909), New York politician
Ant Middleton (born 1980), former British soldier, adventurer and television presenter
Archibald Middleton (born 1871), Australian rules footballer
Arthur Middleton (disambiguation), several people
Barry Middleton (born 1984), field hockey player for England and Great Britain
Bonnor Middleton (1865–1913), South African cricketer
Cecil Middleton (1911-1984), cricketer
C. H. Middleton (Cecil Henry Middleton, 1886–1945), gardener, writer and radio broadcaster
Charles Middleton (disambiguation), several people
Christopher Middleton (poet) (1926–2015), British poet and translator
Clark Middleton (1957-2020), American actor
Clyde Middleton (1928–2019), American politician
Colin Middleton (1910–1983), Irish artist and surrealist
Conyers Middleton (1683–1750), an English clergyman
Dan Middleton (born 1991), British YouTube personality
Darren Middleton (born 1971), Australian lead guitarist for alternative rock band Powderfinger
Darryl Middleton (born 1966), American-Spanish basketball player
David Middleton (disambiguation), several people
Derek Middleton (born 1934), English professional footballer
Edgar Middleton (1894–1939), British playwright and author
Edward Middleton (1810–1883), US Navy Rear Admiral
Edwin Middleton (1865–1929), American film director
Eilidh Middleton (born 1990), equestrian competitor from Scotland
Erasmus Middleton (1739–1805), English clergyman, author and editor
Eva Middleton (1953–2018), Belizean disability rights activist
Faith Middleton (born 1948), American radio journalist
Frank Middleton (footballer) (1879–1943), English footballer
Frederick Dobson Middleton (1825–1898), Canadian militia leader
Gerard V. Middleton (1931–2021), South African-born Canadian geologist and sedimentologist
George Middleton (disambiguation), several people
Graham Middleton (born 1950), Australian Rules footballer
Henry Middleton (disambiguation), several people
Hubert Stanley Middleton (1890–1959), cathedral organist
Humphrey Middleton, 16th-century English Protestant martyr
Ian Middleton (1928–2007), New Zealand novelist
James Middleton (disambiguation), several people named James and Jim
Jenna Middleton, fictional character in Degrassi: The Next Generation
John Middleton (disambiguation), several people
Joshua Middleton, comic book artist
Karen Middleton (disambiguation), several people
Kate Middleton, now Catherine, Princess of Wales (born 1982), wife of William, Prince of Wales
Keynan Middleton (born 1993), American baseball player
Khris Middleton (born 1991), American basketball player
Lindsey Middleton (born March 6, 1991), Canadian actress
Lloyd Middleton, former Australian Rules footballer
Malcolm Middleton (born 1973), Scottish musician
Margaret Yvonne Middleton (1922–2007), better known under her stage name Yvonne De Carlo, Canadian actress
Mary Middleton (1870–1911), British political activist
Max Middleton (born 1946), English composer and keyboardist
Michael Middleton, British businessman, father of Catherine, Princess of Wales
Nick Middleton (born 1960), English physical geographer
O. E. Middleton (Osman Edward Middleton, 1925–2010), New Zealand short story writer
Peter Middleton (disambiguation), several people
Pippa Middleton (born 1983), English columnist and socialite, sister of Catherine, Princess of Wales
Qaasim Middleton (born 1995), American actor, singer and musician
Ray Middleton (1907–1984), American singer and stage, TV and movie actor  
Richard of Middleton (c. 1249 – c. 1308), Scholastic philosopher  
R. Hunter Middleton (1898–1985), American book designer, painter, and type designer
Robbie Middleton (1990–2011), American boy who was raped and torched on his eighth birthday, dying of complications 13 years later
Robert Middleton (disambiguation), several people
Ron Middleton (VC) (1916–1942), Australian Victoria Cross recipient
Scott Middleton, Canadian Musician, guitarist of Cancer Bats
Sheena Booth Middleton (born 1947), better known as Sheena Blackhall, Scottish writer
Stanley Middleton (1919–2009), British novelist
Thomas Middleton (disambiguation), several people
Tom Middleton (born 1971), British recording artist, music producer, remixer and DJ
Troy Houston Middleton (1889–1976), Lieutenant General during World War II
Tuppence Middleton (born 1987), English actress
William Middleton (disambiguation), several people

See also
Baron Middleton, title in the British Peerage
Earl of Middleton, title in the Peerage of Scotland
Middleton family, the family of Catherine, Duchess of Cambridge
 Myddleton
Sir Hugh Myddelton (1560–1631), goldsmith, entrepreneur, drainer of Brading Harbour and developer of the New River, London
Clan Middleton, Scottish clan

References 

English-language surnames
English toponymic surnames